The Pale Blue Eye is a 2003 novel by American writer Louis Bayard. The novel is a murder mystery set at West Point in 1830, where the young Edgar Allan Poe was a cadet. The book was nominated for both an Edgar and a Dagger. It was optioned for a film adaptation by writer-director Scott Cooper, starring Christian Bale and Harry Melling.

References

2003 American novels
American detective novels
American mystery novels
American novels adapted into films
Cultural depictions of Edgar Allan Poe
HarperCollins books
Fiction set in 1830
Novels set in the 1830s
Novels set in New York (state)
United States Military Academy in fiction